This is a list of places on the Victorian Heritage Register in the Shire of Nillumbik in Victoria, Australia. The Victorian Heritage Register is maintained by the Heritage Council of Victoria.

The Victorian Heritage Register, as of 2020, lists the following nine state-registered places within the Shire of Nillumbik:

References

Nillumbik
Shire of Nillumbik